Alva Adams (May 14, 1850 – November 1, 1922) was an American politician.

Early life
Adams was born in Adamsville, Wisconsin on May 14, 1850. He was son of John Adams and Eliza Blanchard. His father, was a member of the Wisconsin State Assembly and the Wisconsin State Senate. Adams was educated in the public schools of Wisconsin, and in 1871 went to Colorado.

Career
Adams was a member of the first Colorado legislature in 1876. He served four years and two months as the fifth, tenth and 14th Governor of Colorado from 1887 to 1889, 1897 to 1899, and briefly in 1905. His last tenure as Governor lasted a little over two months. He and previous Governor James Peabody each declared the other an illegitimate Governor, even though both were involved in illegal electoral practices. Eventually the Republican legislature removed Adams, installed Peabody, who immediately abdicated for his Lt. Governor Jesse Fuller McDonald, and the issue ended.

On November 1, 1922, Adams died in Battle Creek, Michigan at the age of 72.

Adams County, Colorado, is named for Alva Adams,  and it is believed the city of Alva, Oklahoma is as well.  Alva Adams' younger brother, William Herbert "Billy" Adams also served as Governor of Colorado from 1927 to 1933.  Alva Adams' son, Alva Blanchard Adams, served as United States Senator from Colorado from 1923 to 1925 and from 1933 to 1941.

References

External links
The Governor Alva Adams Collection at the Colorado State Archives

Democratic Party governors of Colorado
People from Iowa County, Wisconsin
1850 births
1922 deaths